The 1959 African Cup of Nations was the second edition of the Africa Cup of Nations, the football championship between the national teams of Africa, organised by the Confederation of African Football (CAF). It was hosted and won by the United Arab Republic, a sovereign union between Egypt and Syria. Only three teams participated: host team United Arab Republic, Sudan, and Ethiopia. All three matches took place in Cairo.

Overview 
With only three teams, the format changed into a round robin group, but the results were the same, the United Arab Republic won over Ethiopia 4−0 and over Sudan 2−1. The Sudanese finished second, defeating Ethiopia 1−0.

Mahmoud El-Gohary, who would later become manager of the Egyptian team between 1988 and 2002, would be the top scorer of this edition of the tournament.

Participating teams

Squads

Venues

Final tournament

Scorers 
3 goals
  Mahmoud El-Gohary

2 goals
  Essam Baheeg

1 goal
  Mimi El-Sherbini
  Abdelmutaleb Nasir
  Siddiq Manzul

External links 

 Details at RSSSF

 
Nations
International association football competitions hosted by Egypt
Africa Cup of Nations tournaments
African Cup of Nations
Africa Cup of Nations 
Africa Cup of Nations 
Africa Cup of Nations